The 2000 Paris–Tours was the 94th edition of the Paris–Tours cycle race and was held on 8 October 2000. The race started in Saint-Arnoult-en-Yvelines and finished in Tours. The race was won by Andrea Tafi of the Mapei team.

General classification

References

2000 in French sport
2000
Paris-Tours
2000 in road cycling
October 2000 sports events in Europe